is a 2003 Japanese film directed by Noboru Iguchi.

Cast
Aki Arai as Yuki
Yoshiyoshi Arakawa as Fumio
Kimiko Inui as Yoshie
Akira Takatsuki

References

Films directed by Noboru Iguchi
2000s Japanese films